T. E. Newell (January 5, 1855 – March 19, 1936), born as George Washington Newell, was an American Major League Baseball player who played shortstop in one game for the 1877 St. Louis Brown Stockings of the National League. He was hitless in three at bats in the game.

Initially listed as "T.E. Newell", confirmation of his true identity was found in 2014.

References

External links

1855 births
1936 deaths
19th-century baseball players
Major League Baseball shortstops
St. Louis Brown Stockings players
Evansville Red players
Baseball players from St. Louis